Maksim Aleksandrovich Sukhanov (Russian: Максим Александрович Суханов; born 10 November 1963) is a Soviet and Russian actor, producer, theatrical composer, and restaurateur. His film credits include The Goddess, The Horde, The Country of Deaf and The Role. He was awarded the State Prize of the Russian Federation in 1996 and 2001.

Early life
Maksim Sukhanov was born in Moscow, Russian SFSR, Soviet Union. In 1985 he graduated from the Boris Shchukin Theatre Institute, course T. Kopteva, V. Ivanov. Since 1985, the actor State Academic Theater Vakhtangov. She collaborates with the Lenkom Theatre, the Stanislavsky Theatere, Mayakovsky Theatre.

Filmography
 1998 Country of the Deaf as Svinya
 2000 24 Hours as Felix
 2002 Theatrical Novel as Pyotr Bombardov / Ivan Vasilyevitch
 2004 The Goddess as professor Mikhail Konstantinovich 
 2006 Moscow Mission as Starshiy (Denis)
 2008 The Inhabited Island Part 1 as Dad
 2009 The Inhabited island: Skirmish Part 2 as Dad
 2010 Burnt by the Sun 2 as Stalin
 2011 The Horde (film) as Metropolitan Aleksei
 2013 The Role as Nikolai Yevlakhov
 2016 Viking (film) as Sveneld, voivode of the Grand Duke Sviatoslav Igorevich
 2019 Dark like the Night. Karenina-2019 (short film) as Karenin
 2020 One Breath (film) as Vadim Batyarov
 2020 Masha as Uncle
 2020 Hypnosis as Volkov
 2021 The North Wind (film) as Cousin Boris

External links

  Official Website

Living people
1963 births
Soviet male film actors
Soviet male stage actors
Russian male film actors
Russian male stage actors
Russian composers
Russian male composers
State Prize of the Russian Federation laureates
Recipients of the Nika Award
Male actors from Moscow